Marc Brown may refer to:

Marc Brown (author) (born 1946), American author, creator of the Arthur books and television show
Marc Brown (basketball) (born 1969), American basketball player and coach
Marc Brown (ice hockey) (born 1979), Canadian ice hockey player and coach
Marc Brown (American football) (born 1961), American football wide receiver
Marc Brown (journalist) (born 1961), American news anchor for KABC-TV
Marc Brown, spokesperson and owner of Norton Furniture

See also
Marc Brown Studios, television studio founded by the author Marc Brown
Mark Brown (disambiguation)
Mark Browne (disambiguation)
Marcus Brown (disambiguation)